Marianne Erismann (14 July 1930 – 12 June 2004) was a Swiss swimmer. She competed in the women's 100 metre freestyle at the 1948 Summer Olympics.

References

External links
 

1930 births
2004 deaths
Olympic swimmers of Switzerland
Swimmers at the 1948 Summer Olympics
Place of birth missing
Swiss female freestyle swimmers
20th-century Swiss women